Krivonosovo is a rural locality (a selo) and the administrative center of Krivonosovskoye Rural Settlement, Rossoshansky District, Voronezh Oblast, Russia. The population was 988 as of 2010. There are 9 streets.

Geography 
Krivonosovo is located 49 km southeast of Rossosh (the district's administrative centre) by road. Zhilino is the nearest rural locality.

References 

Rural localities in Rossoshansky District